Crater Rings are adjacent, symmetrical volcanic pit craters in the Western Snake River Plain about 8 miles northwest of Mountain Home, Idaho. They are one of few examples of volcanic craters in the continental United States. The craters are at the summit of a broad shield volcano. The eastern crater is about 3000 ft across and 350 ft deep. The western is 2500 ft across and 300 ft deep. The craters are probably former lava lakes similar to Halemaʻumaʻu of the Kīlauea volcano of Hawaii. The volcano is the youngest of the shield volcanoes near Mountain Home and is estimated to be less than 2 million years old.

Crater Rings are a National Natural Landmark designated in 1980. The site is owned by the Bureau of Land Management as part of the Morley Nelson Snake River Birds of Prey National Conservation Area.

References

External links 
 Surface Mapping of Mars and Related Geologic Studies, King, 1974, p. 2 
 Geonote 41 National Natural Landmarks of Idaho, Gibbons 

National Natural Landmarks in Idaho
Protected areas of Elmore County, Idaho
Landforms of Elmore County, Idaho
Volcanic craters
Bureau of Land Management areas in Idaho